The Sierra de la Laguna is a mountain range at the southern end of the Baja California Peninsula in Mexico, and is the southernmost range of the Peninsular Ranges System.

It is located in La Paz Municipality and Los Cabos Municipality of southern Baja California Sur state.

Ecology
The southern tip of the Baja California Peninsula, including the Sierra de la Laguna, was formerly an island in prehistoric times. It has a distinctive flora and fauna, with many affinities to Southwestern Mexico. The Sierra is home to many endemic species and subspecies. Some of the more common plants restricted to the region are Bidens cabopulmensis, Diospyros intricata, Erythranthe lagunensis, Heimia salicifolia, Hibiscus ribifolius, Indigofera fruticosa, Physalis glabra, Quercus brandegeei, Sida xanti, Stenotis asperuloides, and Yucca capensis.

Above  in elevation, the dry forests transition to the Sierra de la Laguna pine-oak forests ecoregion. The predominant pine is a local subspecies of Mexican Pinyon, Pinus cembroides subsp. lagunae.

The upper reaches of the mountains include endemic species such as a rare succulent plant Dudleya rigida, and a beargrass known as Nolina beldingii.

The forests are exploited commercially for timber, and cattle-raising is common in the oak woodland and dry forest zones.

Biosphere reserve
UNESCO has designated the Sierra de la Laguna a global biosphere reserve: "This semi arid to temperate subhumid climate area represents highly important and contrasted ecosystems, including arid zones, matorrales, low deciduous forest type, evergreen oak: Quercus devia (“encino”) woods, pine-evergreen oak mix woods and oases with palms and “guerivos” situated throughout the gallery forest following the long river basins." The Biosphere reserve was established by a Mexican presidential decree of 6 June 1994, which designated a core area and buffer zones.

The core area is centered on the higher-elevation oak-pine forests, while the transition area includes the communities of Todos Santos, El Pescadero, El Triunfo, San Antonio, San Bartolo, Buena Vista, Los Barriles, Las Cuevas, Santiago and Miraflores, Baja California Sur.

Climate
The climate is influenced by its altitude. At higher altitudes, it has a subtropical highland climate with cool temperatures year round and higher amounts of precipitation.

References

External links

 UNESCO Biosphere Reserves Directory: Sierra de la Laguna

Mountain ranges of Baja California Sur
Peninsular Ranges
La Paz Municipality (Baja California Sur)
Los Cabos Municipality (Baja California Sur)
Biosphere reserves of Mexico
Protected areas of Baja California Sur
Important Bird Areas of Mexico